Vani Kapoor is an Indian golfer.

She won the fifth leg of the 2020 Hero Women's Pro Golf Tour.

References

Year of birth missing (living people)
Living people
Indian female golfers
21st-century Indian women